Ziemomysł of Inowrocław (c. 1245 – October/24 December 1287), was a Polish prince, member of the House of Piast, duke of Inowrocław during 1267-1271 and 1278–1287, and ruler over Bydgoszcz during 1267-1269 and 1278–1287.

Early years
Ziemomysł was the second son of Casimir I of Kuyavia and his second wife Constance, daughter of Henry II the Pious. In 1257 his mother died, and his father soon married for the third time with Euphrosyne, daughter of Casimir I of Opole. Ziemomysł's stepmother soon caused conflicts in the family with her attempts to obtain territorial benefits for her own children (the eldest of them was the future Polish king Władysław the Elbow-high) in detriment of Ziemomysł and his older full-brother Leszek the Black; some chronicles even accused Euphrosyne of attempting to poison both stepsons.

Reign

After his father's death in 1267 Ziemomysł inherited the district of Inowrocław. At the beginning of his reign in the small principality, he managed to survive the invasion of the considerable forces of King Ottokar II of Bohemia, who was bounded to a Crusade against Lithuania. Was probably at this point that Ziemomysł established close contacts with the Teutonic Order and Sambor II, Duke of Pomerelia, alliances which soon brought to him serious troubles - the revolt of his own subjects.

The conflict clearly emerged after Sambor II (his father-in-law since 1268) loaned Ziemomysł some German knights. This preference to foreigners disliked the local knighthood, and caused an armed conflict led by the bishop of Kujawy, Wolimir, in 1269. The rebels called the very known anti-German Bolesław the Pious to help them. Bolesław took Radziejów, Kruszwica and the castle in Bydgoszcz. Only through rapid action did Ziemomysł and the grant to further privileges to Bishop Wolimir allowed him to regain temporary control of his lands.

In 1271, Ziemomysł was involved in the Pomerelian affairs, in which he supported father-in-law Sambor II against Mestwin II. This decision triggered another invasion of Bolesław the Pious, which combined with another revolt of his subjects forced Ziemomysł to escape. Ziemomysł recovered his lands only in 1278 as a result of an agreement between Bolesław the Pious and Leszek the Black in Ląd, where Leszek II returned Inowrocław to his brother only after he promised to take distance himself from all his German advisors. Despite the end of the conflict, Bolesław the Pious kept Radziejów and Kruszwica.

The complete normalization of Ziemomysł's rule took place two years later at the Congress of Rzepka, where after an agreement with Mestwin II, was stipulated that after his death the castellany of Wyszogród had to return to Inowrocław. The final break with his pro-German policy was in 1284, when Ziemomysł supported his brother Leszek in a war against the Teutonic Order. The details of this conflict are unknown. Ziemomysł also began the process of giving Town privileges to his subjects, endowing them upon Gniewkowo.

Ziemomysł died between October and 24 December 1287. It is unknown where he was buried, although is assumed that it happened in the capital of the duchy, Inowrocław.

Marriage and issue 

Probably in 1268, Ziemomysł married Salomea, daughter of Duke Sambor II of Pomerania. They had six children:
 Euphemia (d. young, 3 March 1268/78).
 Fenenna (ca. 1268/77 – 1295) married Andrew III of Hungary.
 Constance (1268/80 – 8 August 1331), a nun.
 Leszek (1275/76 – after 27 April 1339).
 Przemysł (ca. 1278 – November 1338/16 February 1339).
 Kazimierz III of Gniewkowo (1280/84 – 22 August 1345/13 May 1350).

Because his sons are minors at the time of his death, his widow and half-brother Władysław I the Elbow-high took the regency on their behalf.

References

1240s births
1287 deaths
Year of birth uncertain

Piast dynasty
13th-century Polish people
People of Byzantine descent